Rapanea mccomishii  is a flowering plant in the family Primulaceae. The specific epithet honours James Doran McComish (1881–1948), who made several visits to, and collected extensively on, Lord Howe Island in the 1930s.

Description
It is a smooth-stemmed tree, growing to 15 m in height. The oblanceolate-elliptic leaves are 5–7 cm long and 1.7–2.5 cm wide. The flowers are tiny. The round purple fruits are 4–5 mm in diameter.

Distribution and habitat
The plant is endemic to Australia’s subtropical Lord Howe Island in the Tasman Sea, where it is uncommon, having a scattered distribution, mainly at lower elevations.

References

mccomishii
Endemic flora of Lord Howe Island
Ericales of Australia
Plants described in 1944
Taxa named by Thomas Archibald Sprague